In music, Op. 69 stands for Opus number 69. Compositions that are assigned this number include:

 Beethoven – Cello Sonata No. 3
 Britten – Cantata misericordium
 Chopin – Waltz in A-flat major, Op. 69, No. 1
 Chopin – Waltz in B minor, Op. 69, No. 2
 Dvořák – The Spectre's Bride
 Elgar – The Music Makers
 Klebe – Ein wahrer Held
 Schumann – Romanzen volume I (6 partsongs for women's voices)
 Shostakovich – Children's Notebook
 Tchaikovsky – Iolanta